Ludwig Lichtschein  (died 1886, Ofen) was a Hungarian rabbi.

Lichtschein was born Komorn, studied at Pápa, and was rabbinical assessor of Austerlitz, Nagykanizsa, and Esztergom. From 1876 until his death he was rabbi at Somogy-Csurgó.

Lichtschein was the author of the following works:
 A Zsidók Kőzép és Jelenkori Helyzetők (Gross Kanizsa, 1866), on the condition of the Jews in medieval and modern times
 Die Dreizehn Glaubensartikel (Brünn, 1870), a sermon
 Der Targum zu den Propheten (in Stern's Ha-Meḥaḳḳer, i)
 Der Talmud und der Socialismus (ib. iii); Kossuth Lajos és a Sátoraljaúhelyi Rabbi (in Magyar Zsidó Szémle, 1885), on Kossuth and the rabbi of Sátoralja-Ujhely.

References
 

Hungarian rabbis
Hungarian Jews
People from Komárno
Year of birth missing
1886 deaths